Doubly articulated consonants are consonants with two simultaneous primary places of articulation of the same manner (both plosive, or both nasal, etc.). They are a subset of co-articulated consonants. They are to be distinguished from co-articulated consonants with secondary articulation; that is, a second articulation not of the same manner. On the other hand, the voiceless labialized velar plosive  has only a single stop articulation, velar, with a simultaneous approximant-like rounding of the lips. In some dialects of Arabic, the voiceless velar fricative  has a simultaneous uvular trill, but this is not considered double articulation either.

Possibilities for double articulation
There are four independently controllable articulations that may double up in the same manner of articulation: labial, coronal, dorsal, and pharyngeal. (The glottis controls phonation, and works simultaneously with many consonants. It is not normally considered an articulator, and an ejective , with simultaneous closure of the velum and glottis, is not considered a doubly articulated consonant.)

No claims have ever been made for doubly articulated flaps or trills, such as a simultaneous alveolar–uvular trill, and these are not expected to be found. Several claims have been made for doubly articulated fricatives or affricates, most notoriously a Swedish phoneme which has its own IPA symbol, . However, laboratory measurements have never succeeded in demonstrating simultaneous frication at two points of articulation, and such sounds turn out to be either secondary articulation, or a sequence of two non-simultaneous fricatives. (Despite its name, the "voiceless labial-velar fricative"  is actually a voiceless approximant; the name is a historical remnant from before the distinction was made.) Such sounds can be made, with effort, but it is very difficult for a listener to discern them, and therefore they are not expected to be found as distinctive sounds in any language.

Clicks are sometimes said to be doubly articulated, as they involve a coronal (more rarely labial) forward articulation, which defines the various 'types' of clicks and the IPA letter assigned to them, plus a dorsal closure. However, this second, dorsal place of closure functions as part of the controlling mechanism of the lingual ingressive airstream used to generate the click. Thus, much as the glottal closure of ejectives (the airstream-generating mechanism of such consonants) is not considered to be a second place of articulation, clicks are not generally described as such either. Indeed, it is possible to have a true doubly articulated click, such as the labial-dental allophone, of the bilabial click  in Taa.

Double articulation in stops

This leaves stops, and both oral and nasal doubly articulated stops are found. However, there is a great asymmetry in the places of their articulation. Of the six possible combinations of labial, coronal, dorsal, and pharyngeal, one is common, and the others vanishingly rare.

The common articulation is labial–dorsal, which includes labial–velar stops such as the  mentioned above, and labial-uvular stops such as [q͡p]. Labial-velar stops are found throughout West and Central Africa, as well as eastern New Guinea. Labial-uvular stops are much rarer, but have been found in three Mangbutu-Efe languages spoken in the Democratic Republic of the Congo and Uganda: Mamvu, and Lese. These languages contain some highly unusual doubly articulated stops that have been confirmed by acoustic and aerodynamic measurements, including a phonemic labial-uvular stop with a voiceless uvular part and a voiced implosive bilabial part, [q͡ɓ], a non-phonemic labial-velar stop with a voiced velar part and a voiceless bilabial part, [ɡ͡p] (which occurs as an allophone of a voiced labial-velar implosive, [ɠɓ]), and a non-phonemic voiceless labial-velar stop with a trilled release, [k͡pʙ̥] (only present in Efe). Fully voiceless labial-uvular [q͡p] occurs also, as an allophone of /q͡ɓ/.
A second possibility, labial–coronal, is attested phonemically by labial–alveolar and labial–postalveolar in a single language, Yélî Dnye of New Guinea. Some West African languages, such as Dagbani and Nzema, have labial–postalveolars as allophones of labial–velars before high front vowels.
A third possibility, coronal–dorsal, is found marginally in a few languages. Isoko, spoken in Nigeria, has laminal dental stops (plosives and nasals) that in some dialects are realized as dental–palatal stops. However, these are not contrastive with either dental or palatal stops, unlike the articulations mentioned above, and Peter Ladefoged considers them to be "accidental contacts in two regions", rather than being inherently double. Hadza has alveolar–palatal lateral affricates, but the dental contact is optional. Similarly, several languages of Australia, such as Maung, have dental–palatals which are variants of laminal postalveolars, with an "extended closure covering the entire region from the teeth to the hard palate". In both cases, the double articulations are variants of laminal consonants, which have inherently broad contact with the roof of the mouth. If the sj-sound [ɧ] in Swedish is, in fact, a velar fricative [x] and a post-alveolar fricative [ʃ] pronounced at the same time, then it is a coronal-dorsal consonant. 
The other three possibilities, which would involve the epiglottis, had not been known until recently. However, with the advent of fiber-optic laryngoscopy, a greater variety of epiglottal and laryngeal activity has been found than had been expected. For example, the Somali  was recently found to be a uvular–epiglottal consonant . It is not known how widespread such sounds might be, or if epiglottal consonants might combine with coronal or labial consonants.

The Bantu languages Ila, Kafue Twa and Lundwe have been described as having labio-glottal and palato-glottal fricatives. See Ila language for a description.

Triple articulation
Triply articulated consonants are only attested as glottalized doubly articulated consonants, and this can be argued to be an effect of phonation or airstream mechanism rather than as a third articulation, just as other glottalized consonants are not considered to be doubly articulated. The most obvious case are the various types of glottalized clicks mentioned above.

References

Peter Ladefoged and Ian Maddieson, The Sounds of the World's Languages. Blackwell Publishers, 1996. 

 
Phonetics